Alness railway station is a railway station on the Far North Line, serving the town of Alness, on the Cromarty Firth, in the Highland council area of Scotland. ScotRail, who manage the station, operate all services.

History 

On this last stretch, one of the original stations was that at Alness. The I&AJR in turn amalgamated with other railways to form the Highland Railway in 1865, which became part of the London, Midland and Scottish Railway during the Grouping of 1923. The line then passed on to the Scottish Region of British Railways on nationalisation in 1948. The station at Alness was then closed by the British Transport Commission on 13 June 1960 and remained so for 13 years.
 
The station reopened on 7 May 1973 after significant housing development in the area. The initial service provision was three trains each way on weekdays and one on Sundays. When sectorisation was introduced by British Rail in the 1980s, the station was served by ScotRail until the privatisation of British Rail.

The original station platforms can still be seen on both sides of the single line through the station.

Facilities 
The station consists of one platform on the northern side of the railway, with only a small shelter available. The station also has a small car park, bike racks and a bench. As there are no facilities to purchase tickets, passengers must buy one in advance, or from the guard on the train.

Platform layout 
The station has a single platform which is long enough for a six-coach train.

Passenger volume 

The statistics cover twelve month periods that start in April.

Services 

On weekdays and Saturdays, there are 7 trains northbound (4 to Wick via Thurso, 1 to Invergordon, 1 to Ardgay and 1 to Tain) and 8 trains southbound to Inverness. On Sundays, there are five trains southbound to Inverness, and 5 trains northbound (3 to Tain, 1 to Invergordon and 1 through to Wick.

References

Bibliography

External links
 RAILSCOT article on Inverness and Ross-shire Railway
 Alness station on navigable 1947 O.S. map

Railway stations in Highland (council area)
Former Highland Railway stations
Railway stations in Great Britain opened in 1863
Railway stations in Great Britain closed in 1960
Railway stations in Great Britain opened in 1973
Reopened railway stations in Great Britain
Railway stations served by ScotRail
1863 establishments in Scotland
Alness